Delivering Milo is a 2001 film written by David Hubbard and directed by Nick Castle. Anton Yelchin stars as Milo, while Bridget Fonda and Campbell Scott play his parents. Albert Finney stars as Elmore Dahl, a guardian angel sent to convince a soul that life on Earth is worth living.

Plot
Elizabeth and Kevin live in NYC in the loft above his glassblowing studio and are expecting their first child. Believing she has gone into labor, they hurry to the hospital. But, once there, the obstretician tells her she was having Braxton Hicks contractions. 

The reality is that in the world from which babies come, Milo is too scared to leave the comfortable place where he has lived. Since babies must be born in order, no other babies will be born until he changes his mind. The people in charge give the job of educating Milo to Elmore, who is in a kind of limbo until he proves he is worthy of Heaven.

Elmore bargains with the powers that be. He must get Milo to say he wants to be born in exchange for more time on Earth. To convince Milo to accompany him, they let the cards decide, and Elmore is triumphant.  

Elizabeth calls her mom, updating her. She mentions she saw a man who looked like her father who'd abandoned them years ago. 

Elmore and Milo go out the door which normally serves only as an entrance. Outside is the energetic and terrifying New York City. Elmore loves it, but Milo doesn't want to be in this scary place.

Milo is introduced to a deli, ice cream and Central Park. Once his natural bodily functions kick in he is less convinced. A call from above suggests that Elmore try to inspire Milo's soul, but a museum visit has the opposite effect. 

As the day goes on, the big news story seen in the background is the lack of births globally. This is a reminder of how Milo's doubt and refusal to be born has affected the world.

Cleaning up the studio after a pipe burst, Elizabeth finds a bag with Atlantic City parpheranalia from her dad. She plays blackjack with her husband's workmate, and doing well, she impulsively goes to Atlantic City. Almost simultaneously Elmore takes Milo there too, as he loved to gamble when he was alive. 

Milo's mind has not been changed and there is a deadline: at midnight, the door that the souls go through to be born will close, and no more babies will ever be born. In Atlantic City, Elizabeth meets Milo. He realizes she is his mother, and decides he wants to be born. He also realizes Elmore is the father who abandoned Elizabeth.

Milo is born and Elmore is finally ascended from limbo to heaven.

Cast
 Anton Yelchin as Milo
 Albert Finney as Elmore Dahl
 Bridget Fonda as Elizabeth
 Campbell Scott as Kevin

See also
 List of films about angels

References

External links
 
 

2001 films
2000s fantasy comedy-drama films
American fantasy comedy-drama films
Films about angels
Films directed by Nick Castle
Films scored by Craig Safan
Films set in Atlantic City, New Jersey
Films set in New York City
Films shot in New York City
Films shot in Atlantic City, New Jersey
American pregnancy films
2001 comedy films
2000s English-language films
2000s American films